De Soto is an unincorporated community in Washington County, Nebraska, United States.  It was named in honor of the sixteenth-century Spanish explorer, Hernando De Soto. De Soto was founded in 1855 and served as the county seat from 1858-1866. During its heyday, the town hosted many flourishing new businesses: hotels, saloons, stores, newspapers and banks.

De Soto contains farmland with about three families residing there.

References

External links

Unincorporated communities in Washington County, Nebraska
Populated places established in 1855
Unincorporated communities in Nebraska
1855 establishments in Nebraska Territory